The Communications Decency Act of 1996 (CDA) was the United States Congress's first notable attempt to regulate pornographic material on the Internet. In the 1997 landmark case Reno v. ACLU, the United States Supreme Court unanimously struck the act's anti-indecency provisions.

The Act is the short name of Title V of the Telecommunications Act of 1996, as specified in Section 501 of the 1996 Act. Senators James Exon and Slade Gorton introduced it to the Senate Committee of Commerce, Science, and Transportation in 1995. The amendment that became the CDA was added to the Telecommunications Act in the Senate by an 81–18 vote on June 15, 1995.

As eventually passed by Congress, Title V affected the Internet (and online communications) in two significant ways. First, it attempted to regulate both indecency (when available to children) and obscenity in cyberspace. Second, Section 230 of title 47 of the U.S. Code, part of a codification of the Communications Act of 1934 (Section 9 of the Communications Decency Act / Section 509 of the Telecommunications Act of 1996) has been interpreted to mean that operators of Internet services are not publishers (and thus not legally liable for the words of third parties who use their services).

Anti-indecency and anti-obscenity provisions
The act's most controversial portions were those relating to indecency on the Internet. The relevant sections were introduced in response to fears that Internet pornography was on the rise. Indecency in TV and radio broadcasting had already been regulated by the Federal Communications Commission: broadcasting of offensive speech was restricted to hours of the day when minors were supposedly least likely to be exposed, and violators could be fined and lose their licenses. But the Internet had only recently been opened to commercial interests by the 1992 amendment to the National Science Foundation Act and thus had not been taken into consideration by previous laws. The CDA, which affected both the Internet and cable television, marked the first attempt to expand regulation to these new media.

Passed by Congress on February 1, 1996, and signed by President Bill Clinton on February 8, 1996, the CDA imposed criminal sanctions on anyone who

It further criminalized the transmission of "obscene or indecent" materials to persons known to be under 18.

Free speech advocates worked diligently and successfully to overturn the portion relating to indecent, but not obscene, speech. They argued that speech protected under the First Amendment, such as printed novels or the use of the "seven dirty words", would suddenly become unlawful when posted online. Critics also claimed the bill would have a chilling effect on the availability of medical information. Online civil liberties organizations arranged protests against the bill, such as the Black World Wide Web protest, which encouraged webmasters to make their sites' backgrounds black for 48 hours after its passage, and the Electronic Frontier Foundation's Blue Ribbon Online Free Speech Campaign.

Legal challenges
On June 12, 1996, a panel of federal judges in Philadelphia blocked part of the CDA, saying it would infringe upon adults' free speech rights. The next month, another federal court in New York struck down the portion of the CDA intended to protect children from indecent speech as too broad. On June 26, 1997, the Supreme Court upheld the Philadelphia court's decision in Reno v. American Civil Liberties Union, stating that the indecency provisions were an unconstitutional abridgement of the First Amendment because they did not permit parents to decide for themselves what material was acceptable for their children, extended to non-commercial speech, and did not carefully define the words "indecent" and "offensive". (The Court affirmed the New York case, Reno v. Shea, the next day, without a published opinion.)

In 2003, Congress amended the CDA to remove the indecency provisions struck down in Reno v. ACLU. A separate challenge to the provisions governing obscenity, known as Nitke v. Gonzales, was rejected by a federal court in New York in 2005. The Supreme Court summarily affirmed that decision in 2006.

Congress has made two narrower attempts to regulate children's exposure to Internet indecency since the Supreme Court overturned the CDA. Court injunction blocked enforcement of the first, the Child Online Protection Act (COPA), almost immediately after its passage in 1998; the law was later overturned. While legal challenges also dogged COPA's successor, the Children's Internet Protection Act (CIPA) of 2000, the Supreme Court upheld it as constitutional in 2004.

Section 230

Section 230 of title 47 of the U.S. Code, a codification of the Communications Act of 1934 (added by Section 9 of the Communications Decency Act / Section 509 of the Telecommunications Act of 1996) was not part of the original Senate legislation, but was added in conference with the House, where it had been separately introduced by Representatives Christopher Cox and Ron Wyden as the Internet Freedom and Family Empowerment Act and passed by a near-unanimous vote on the floor. It added protection for online service providers and users from actions against them based on third-party content, stating in part, "No provider or user of an interactive computer service shall be treated as the publisher or speaker of any information provided by another information content provider." Effectively, this section immunizes both ISPs and Internet users from liability for torts others commit on their websites or online forums, even if the provider fails to take action after receiving notice of the harmful or offensive content.

Through the so-called Good Samaritan provision, this section also protects ISPs from liability for restricting access to certain material or giving others the technical means to restrict access to that material.

On July 23, 2013, the attorneys general of 47 states sent Congress a letter requesting that the criminal and civil immunity in section 230 be removed. The ACLU wrote of the proposal, "If Section 230 is stripped of its protections, it wouldn't take long for the vibrant culture of free speech to disappear from the web."

FOSTA-SESTA

Ann Wagner introduced the Allow States and Victims to Fight Online Sex Trafficking Act (FOSTA) in the U.S. House of Representatives in April 2017. Rob Portman introduced the similar Stop Enabling Sex Traffickers Act (SESTA) in the U.S. Senate in August 2017. The combined FOSTA-SESTA package passed the House on February 27, 2018, with a vote of 388–25 and the Senate on March 21, 2018, with a vote of 97–2. President Donald Trump signed the package into law on April 11, 2018.

The bill makes it illegal to knowingly assist, facilitate, or support sex trafficking, and amends the Communications Decency Act's section 230 safe harbors (which make online services immune from civil liability for their users' actions) to exclude enforcement of federal or state sex trafficking laws from immunity. The intent is to provide serious legal consequences for websites that profit from sex trafficking and give prosecutors tools to protect their communities and give victims a pathway to justice.

The bills were criticized by pro-free speech and pro-Internet groups as a "disguised internet censorship bill" that weakens the section 230 safe harbors, places unnecessary burdens on internet companies and intermediaries that handle user-generated content or communications, with service providers required to proactively take action against sex trafficking activities, and requires lawyers to evaluate all possible scenarios under state and federal law (which may be financially unfeasible for smaller companies).  Online sex workers argued that the bill would harm their safety, as the platforms they use to offer and discuss their services (as an alternative to street prostitution) had begun to reduce their services or shut down entirely because of the bill's threat of liability. Since FOSTA-SESTA passed, sex workers have reported economic instability and increases in violence, as had been predicted.

Failure-to-warn lawsuits

In Jane Doe No. 14 v. Internet Brands, Inc., the plaintiff filed an action alleging that Internet Brands, Inc.'s failure to warn users of its modelmayhem.com networking website caused her to be a victim of a rape scheme. On May 31, 2016, the Court of Appeals for the Ninth Circuit ruled that the Communications Decency Act does not bar the plaintiff's failure to warn claim.

See also

Online Copyright Infringement Liability Limitation Act portion of the Digital Millennium Copyright Act, which contingently protects online service providers from liability for copyright infringement
Stanley v. Georgia
United States v. Playboy Entertainment Group, Inc.

References

External links

 Legislative history of the Communications Decency Act before amendment.
 FCC text of the full act.
 Section 230
 Text of FOSTA-SESTA bill that was Presidentially signed into law as Pub.L. 115-164 (PDF (authoritative))
 Internet Library of Law and Court Decisions Court decisions applying section 230 of the Communications Decency Act
 Center for Democracy and Technology Overview of CDA. This refers only to the portion of the act which was struck down.
 Cybertelecom :: The Communications Decency Act and Sec. 230 Good Samaritan Defense
 EFF.org, bloggers on section 230

 
Acts of the 104th United States Congress
Internet censorship in the United States
United States federal computing legislation
Obscenity law